Boško (Cyrillic script: Бошко) is a Slavic male given name. It may refer to:
 Boško Abramović (born 1951), Serbian chess grandmaster
 Boško Anić (born 1968), retired Croatian footballer
 Boško Antić (1944–2007), Bosnian Serb footballer
 Boško Balaban (born 1978), Croatian footballer
 Boško Baškot (1921–2013), Yugoslav politician
 Boško Boškovič (born 1969), retired Slovenian football goalkeeper
 Boško Božinović (born 1949), Croatian conditioning coach and a retired middle-distance runner
 Boško Buha (1926–1943), young Yugoslav Partisan and World War II icon
 Boško Bursać (born 1945), former Bosnian Croat footballer
 Boško Ćirković "Škabo" (born 1976), Serbian rapper
 Boško Čvorkov (born 1978), Serbian footballer
 Boško Đokić (born 1958), Serbian professional basketball coach and journalist
 Boško Dopuđ (born 1990), Serbian football defender
 Boško Đorđević (born 1953), retired Serbian footballer
 Boško Drašković (born 1987), Montenegrin boxer
 Boško Gjurovski (born 1961), Macedonian footballer
 Boško Janković (born 1983), Serbian footballer
 Boško Jovović (born 1983), Serbian professional basketball player
 Boško Kajganić (1949–1977), former Yugoslav footballer
 Boško Krunić (1929–2017), Yugoslavian Communist political figure
 Boško Lozica (born 1952), former water polo player
 Boško Marinko (1939–2020), Serbian former wrestler
 Boško Mihajlović (born 1971), Serbian former footballer
 Boško Minić (born 1966), former Serbian footballer
 Boško Obradović (born 1976), Serbian politician
 Boško Palkovljević Pinki (1920–1942), prominent Yugoslav Partisan fighter in World War II and People's Hero
 Boško Perošević (1956–2000), Serbian politician, former Chairman of Executive Council of Vojvodina
 Boško Petrović (footballer) (born 1975), former Serbian football player
 Boško Prodanović (born 1943), retired Serbian professional footballer
 Boško Radonjić, known as "The Yugo" (1943–2011), Serbian nationalist and Irish American mob leader
 Boško Radulović (born 1996), Montenegrin swimmer
 Boško Ralić (1904–1978), Serbian footballer and coach
 Boško Simonović (1898–1965), Yugoslav
 Boško Stupić (born 1984), Bosnian footballer
 Boško Todorović (1905–1942), Chetnik commander
 Boško Virjanac (died 1915), Serbian Chetnik commander
 Boško Virčanac, Serbian Chetnik commander
 Boško Vuksanović (1928–2011), Yugoslav water polo player who competed in the 1952 Summer Olympics
 Božo Janković "Boško" (1951–1993), Bosnian and Yugoslav football player
 Romeo and Juliet in Sarajevo, a 1994 documentary about the deaths of Sarajevan lovers Admira Ismić and Boško Brkić

See also 
Boško Buha Theatre, in Belgrade, Serbia
Bošković, surname
 Boškovići (disambiguation), toponym
 Bosko (disambiguation)

Slavic masculine given names
Serbian masculine given names
Slovene masculine given names
Croatian masculine given names
Macedonian masculine given names
Bosnian masculine given names
Bulgarian masculine given names
Ukrainian masculine given names